The Magical Portrait is a 1997 Russian-Chinese fantasy film directed by Gennady Vasilyev in his last film before his death.

Plot 
Ivan lives in a village where he finds a portrait of the beautiful Chinese woman Qiao Xin, the portrait comes to life later and both fall in love with each other. And suddenly an evil sorcerer, just as enchanted by Qiao Xin, comes to the village.

Cast 
 Sergey Shnyryov as Ivan
 Li Gao as Qiao Xin
 Valentina Telichkina
 Andrey Martynov
 Vladimir Antonik as The Duke
 Irina Bezrukova
 Natalya Goncharova
 Tszjangjuang Chang
 Vladimir Episkoposyan	
 Sergey Galkin

References

External links 
 

1997 films
1990s fantasy drama films
Films shot in Guangdong
Films shot in Russia
1990s Mandarin-language films
1990s Russian-language films
Russian fantasy drama films
Chinese multilingual films
Russian multilingual films
1997 multilingual films
Films based on fairy tales